Gina Niland Craig (born 22 September 1972) is an Irish former professional tennis player.

Biography
Niland, a right-handed player raised in Limerick, was an Irish number one and a five-time winner of the Irish Close Championship singles title. She had a 12-year Fed Cup career for Ireland, appearing in a record 42 ties. With 34 overall match wins, she is Ireland's most successful Fed Cup player. Competing on the international tennis circuit in the 1990s, Niland reached a best singles ranking of 470 in the world.

Her brother, Conor Niland, was also a professional tennis player.

ITF finals

Singles (0-2)

Doubles (2-1)

References

External links
 
 
 

1972 births
Living people
Irish female tennis players
Sportspeople from Limerick (city)